Kelly Marvin Irep (born 1 September 1995) is a professional footballer who plays as a left-back for Championnat National 2 club Créteil. Born in metropolitan France, he plays for the Guadeloupe national team.

Club career
After beginning his early career in the lower divisions of France, Irep signed a professional contract with Le Havre on 8 January 2018. He made his senior debut for Le Havre in a 2–0 Coupe de la Ligue win over Bourg-en-Bresse on 14 August 2018. He was loaned in January 2019 until June 2019 to Lyon-Duchère.

In July 2021, Irep returned to France and signed with Créteil.

International career
Irep was called up to the Guadeloupe national team for CONCACAF Nations League match against Curaçao on 19 November 2018. He made his debut for the squad in that game, as a starter, which Guadeloupe lost with the score of 0–6.

References

External links
 
 Kelly Irep at HACFoot
 

1995 births
Living people
People from Mantes-la-Jolie
Footballers from Yvelines
Association football fullbacks
French footballers
French people of Guadeloupean descent
Guadeloupean footballers
Guadeloupe international footballers
FC Mantois 78 players
Le Havre AC players
US Raon-l'Étape players
Lyon La Duchère players
Football Bourg-en-Bresse Péronnas 01 players
Enosis Neon Paralimni FC players
US Créteil-Lusitanos players
Ligue 2 players
Championnat National players
Championnat National 2 players
Championnat National 3 players
Cypriot First Division players
Guadeloupean expatriate footballers
Expatriate footballers in Cyprus
Guadeloupean expatriate sportspeople in Cyprus
2021 CONCACAF Gold Cup players